Cepicky is a surname, probably Czech Čepický. Notable people with the surname include:

Matt Cepicky (born 1977), American baseball player
Scott Cepicky (born 1966), American politician
 Leoš Čepický, a violinist of the Wihan Quartet

Surnames of Czech origin